Sirin Gioro (pinyin: Xilin Jueluo) was a clan of the Manchu nobility, one of the prominent Gioro family. The other clans of Gioro Hala were Aisin Gioro (爱新觉罗), the ruling clan from 1616 to 1912, Irgen Gioro (伊尔根觉罗) and Šušu Gioro (舒舒觉罗). The clan belonged to the Bordered Blue Banner. The clan members inhabited the area ranging from Nimaca, Hoifa, Changbai Mountains, Jianzhou, Ningguta and Hada

Modern day descendants of the clan changed their surnames to Zhao (赵), E (鄂), Chen (陈), Huang (黄) and other.

Notable figures

Males
Tuntai (屯台), one of the founders of the Qing dynasty.
Tai'erkang (泰尔康)
Ortai
Jiqing (吉卿)
Luolin (罗霖), served as a sixth rank literary official (主事, pinyin: zhushi)
Zhuolintai (卓林泰), served as a secretary
Prince Consorts

Females
Imperial Consort
 Imperial Noble Consort
 Imperial Noble Consort Dunhui (1856–1933), the Tongzhi Emperor's imperial concubine

 Noble Lady
 Noble Lady E (1733–1808), the Qianlong Emperor's noble lady

Princess Consort
 Primary Consort
 Šurhaci's ninth primary consort
 Ajige's first primary consort, the mother of Hedu (1619–1646)
 Yongqi's primary consort, the mother of sixth son (1765)

 Concubine
 Nurhaci's concubine, the mother of Laimbu (1612–1646)
 Hooge's concubine, the mother of eighth daughter (1641–1703) and ninth daughter (1644–1661)
 Hooge's concubine, the mother of 11th daughter (1646 – 1692 or 1693)

References

Bordered Blue Banner
Gioro clans
Sirin Gioro